Dandu Gopalapuram is a village and panchayat in Santha Bommali mandal, Srikakulam district of Andhra Pradesh, India. There is a small railway station here in Howrah-Chennai mainline under East Coast Railway, Indian Railways.

Demographics
 Indian census, the demographic details of
 Total Population: 	2,584 in 579 Households
 Male Population: 	1,303 and Female Population: 	1,281
 Children Under 6 years of age: 329 (Boys Under 6 Years: -  162 and Girls - 	167)
 Total Literates: 	1,335
 The number of employers in this village is 60

Transportation 
 Dandu Gopalapuram village is well connected by APSRTC Buses , which runs from Srikakulam , Kotabommali to Tekkali , Vaddi Thandra Villages.

 Autos , Cabs are in good frequency to reach this Dandu Gopalapuram village.
 State Highway 111 makes junction at Vaddi Thandra Village.
 Major district road 59 Passes through Dandu Gopalapuram , from  Vaddi Thandra to Ravivalasa village and meets State Highway 90 at Ravivalasa village near Tekkali .

Villages in Srikakulam district